Specific fuel consumption may refer to:

 Brake-specific fuel consumption, fuel efficiency within a shaft engine
 Thrust-specific fuel consumption, fuel efficiency of an engine design with respect to thrust output